Earl Klugh (born September 16, 1953) is an American acoustic guitarist and composer. He has won one Grammy award and thirteen nominations. Klugh was awarded the “1977 Best Recording Award For Performance and Sound” for his album “Finger Painting” by “Swing Journal” a Japanese jazz magazine.

Biography
At the age of six, Klugh commenced training on the piano until he switched to the guitar at the age of ten. At the age of thirteen, Klugh was captivated by the guitar playing of Chet Atkins when Atkins made an appearance on the Perry Como Show. Klugh was a performing guest on several of Atkins' albums. Atkins, reciprocating as well, joined Earl on his Magic In Your Eyes album. Klugh also appeared with Atkins on several television programs, including Hee Haw and a 1994 TV special titled "Read my Licks". Klugh was also influenced by Bob James, Ray Parker Jr, Wes Montgomery and Laurindo Almeida. His sound is a blend of these jazz, pop and rhythm and blues influences, forming a potpourri of sweet contemporary music original to only him.

Klugh's first recording, at age fifteen, was on Yusef Lateef's Suite 16. He played on George Benson's White Rabbit album and two years later, in 1973, joined his touring band.

For their album One on One, Klugh and Bob James received a Grammy award for Best Pop Instrumental Performance of 1981. He has since received 12 Grammy nominations, millions of record and CD sales, and continues touring worldwide to this day.

Klugh has recorded over 30 albums including 23 Top Ten charting records—five of them No. 1—on Billboard's Jazz Album chart. With 2008's The Spice of Life, Klugh earned his 12th career Grammy nomination—his second nomination and release on the independent Koch label.

Each spring, Klugh hosts an event called Weekend of Jazz, featuring jazz musicians at the Broadmoor Hotel & Resort in Colorado Springs. Jazz greats including Ramsey Lewis, Patti Austin, Chuck Mangione, Bob James, Joe Sample, Chris Botti, Roberta Flack, and Arturo Sandoval have all performed at the annual event. In November 2010, Klugh brought the 'Weekend of Jazz' to Kiawah Island Golf Resort in South Carolina.

Discography

Studio albums

Earl Klugh Trio albums

Duet albums

Soundtrack albums

Video

References

External links

1954 births
Living people
20th-century American guitarists
21st-century American guitarists
American jazz guitarists
African-American guitarists
Grammy Award winners
MNRK Music Group artists
Smooth jazz guitarists
Return to Forever members
GRP Records artists
Fingerstyle guitarists
American acoustic guitarists
American male guitarists
20th-century American male musicians
21st-century American male musicians
American male jazz musicians
20th-century African-American musicians
21st-century African-American musicians